Robert William McLeod (19 January 1868 – 15 June 1907) was an Australian cricketer who played in six Test matches in 1892 and 1893. On his debut, he took five wickets in the first innings against England in Melbourne in 1892.

Biography
McLeod was born in Port Melbourne, Victoria. After retiring as a player he continued to be involved as a selector, team manager, committeeman and delegate to the Victorian Cricket Association.  In 1907 he replaced H. C. A. Harrison as the Melbourne Cricket Club representative on the Victorian Football League. He died on 15 June 1907 in Middle Park, Victoria. His brother, Charlie, also played cricket for Australia.

References

1868 births
1907 deaths
Australia Test cricketers
Victoria cricketers
Melbourne Cricket Club cricketers
Australian cricketers
Cricketers who have taken five wickets on Test debut
Cricketers from Melbourne
People from Port Melbourne
Australian rules football administrators
Australian cricket administrators
Melbourne Football Club administrators